The New Zealand Police is the national police service and principal law enforcement agency of New Zealand, responsible for preventing crime, enhancing public safety, bringing offenders to justice, and maintaining public order. With about 13,000 personnel, it is the largest law enforcement agency in New Zealand and, with few exceptions, has primary jurisdiction over the majority of New Zealand criminal law. The New Zealand Police also has responsibility for traffic and commercial vehicle enforcement as well as other key responsibilities including protection of dignitaries, firearms licensing, and matters of national security.

Policing in New Zealand was introduced in 1840, modelled on similar constabularies that existed in Britain at that time. The constabulary was initially part police and part militia. By the end of the 19th century policing by consent was the goal. The New Zealand Police has generally enjoyed a reputation for mild policing, but there have been cases when the use of force was criticised, such as during the 1981 Springbok tour.

The current Minister of Police is Megan Woods. While the New Zealand Police is a government department with a minister responsible for it, the Commissioner and sworn members swear allegiance directly to the Sovereign and, by convention, have constabulary independence from the government of the day.

The New Zealand Police is perceived to have a minimal level of institutional corruption.

Origins and history

Policing in New Zealand started in 1840 with the arrival of six constables accompanying Lt. Governor Hobson's official landing party to form the colony of New Zealand. Early policing arrangements were along similar lines to the UK and British colonial police forces, in particular the Royal Irish Constabulary and the New South Wales Police Force. Many of its first officers had seen prior service in either Ireland or Australia. The early force was initially part police and part militia.

The Constabulary Act 1846 aided at 'preserving the peace, and preventing robberies and other felonies, and apprehending offenders against the peace.' The Armed Constabulary Act 1867 focused the force on dealing with unrest between the indigenous Māori and the encroaching European settlers and the force grew to 200 musket-trained men. The Armed Constabulary took part in military actions against Māori opponents Riwha Titokowaru in Taranaki and Te Kooti in the central North Island in the dying stages of the New Zealand Wars.

From the police force's beginnings in 1840 through the next 40 years, policing arrangements varied around New Zealand. Whilst the nationally organised Armed Constabulary split its efforts between regular law enforcement functions and militia support to the land wars, some provinces desired local police forces of their own. This led to a separate Provincial Police Force Act being passed by the parliament. However, provincial policing models lasted only two decades as economic depression in the 1870s saw some provinces stop paying their police as they ran out of money. Eventually, the government decided a single nationally organised police would be the best and most efficient policing arrangement.

The New Zealand Police Force was established as a single national force under the Police Force Act of 1886. The change in name was significant, and provincial policing arrangements were dis-established and their staff largely absorbed into the newly created New Zealand Police Force. At the same time, the government took the important step to hive off the militia functions of the old Armed Constabulary, and form the genesis of today's New Zealand Defence Force, initially called in 1886 the New Zealand Permanent Militia.

Just a decade later, policing in New Zealand was given a significant overhaul. In 1898 there was a very constructive Royal Commission of Enquiry into New Zealand Police. The Royal Commission, which included the reforming Commissioner Tunbridge who had come from the Metropolitan Police in London, produced a far-reaching report which laid the basis for positive reform of New Zealand Police for the next several decades. A complete review of police legislation in 1908 built significantly off the Royal Commission's work.

A further Police Force Act in 1947 reflected some changes of a growing New Zealand, and a country coming out of World War II. The most significant change in the structure and arrangement for police came after the departure of Commissioner Compton under a cloud of government and public concern over his management of Police in 1955. The appointment of a caretaker civilian leader of police, especially titled "Controller General" to recognise his non-operational background, opened the windows on the organisation and allowed a period of positive and constructive development to take place.

In 1958, the word "Force" was removed from the name when legislation was significantly revised.

On 1 July 1992, the Traffic Safety Service of the Ministry of Transport was merged with the police. Up until that time, the Ministry of Transport and local councils had been responsible for traffic law enforcement. In 2001, the police re-established a specialist road policing branch known as the Highway Patrol. Today the police are mainly responsible for enforcing traffic law, while local councils can appoint parking wardens, who can enforce traffic rules regarding parking and special vehicle lanes. In 2010, after some calls to split traffic enforcement again from standard police duties, it was decided that it would remain part of their duties, partly due to the public having shown "enormous support" for it remaining this way.

The Police Act 1958 was extensively reviewed starting in 2006, after a two and a half-year consultative process the Policing Act 2008 came into effect on 1 October 2008. The process included the world's first use of a wiki to allow the public to submit or propose amendments. The wiki was open for less than two weeks, but drew international attention.

More recently, the New Zealand Police has been involved in international policing and peacekeeping missions to East Timor and the Solomon Islands, to assist these countries with establishing law and order after civil unrest. They have also been involved in community police training in Bougainville, in conjunction with Australian Federal Police. Other overseas deployments for regional assistance and relief have been to Afghanistan as part of the reconstruction effort, the Kingdom of Tonga, Thailand for the tsunami disaster and Indonesia after terrorist bombings. New Zealand Police maintains an international policing support network in eight foreign capitals, and has about 80 staff deployed in differing international missions.

Female officers

In 1936, there was 'a proposal to establish a women police branch in New Zealand', and former principal of the women's section of the South Australia Police, Kate Cocks (1875–1954) attended to speak to the member of the government, the Commissioner of Police, and a gathering of women's societies.  Cocks was the first of two female officers in December 1915 with the SA Police, until her retirement in 1935, with the largest women's section of all Australian state law enforcement agencies.

Women were first admitted to the police in 1941 but were not issued with uniforms. One of the first intake was Edna Pearce, who received the badge number S1 when she was finally issued a uniform in 1952. Pearce made the first arrest by a woman police officer in New Zealand.  By January 1949, officer Miss R. M. Hadfield did a cross-Tasman interchange, working for two months in Sydney, a month in Melbourne, and Tasmania.   At the time, female officers wore only a small badge under the coat lapel.

In 1992 less than 10% of the New Zealand Police Force were women.

Organisation

The Police National Headquarters provides policy and planning advice as well as national oversight and management of the organisation. Although headed by a Commissioner, the New Zealand Police is a decentralised organisation divided into 12 districts.

Each district has a geographical area of responsibility and a central station from which subsidiary and suburban stations are managed. As of March 2019, there are 327 police stations around the country with nearly 12,000 staff who respond to more than 600,000 emergency 111 calls each year.

The Commissioner is in overall charge of the New Zealand Police. Assisting the Commissioner are two chief officers in the rank of Deputy Commissioner: Deputy Commissioner-Resource Management; and Deputy Commissioner-Operations.

Five chief officers in the rank of Assistant Commissioner and the Director of Intelligence report to the Deputy Commissioner-Operations. The Assistant Commissioner-Investigations/International is responsible for the National Criminal Investigations Group, the Organised and Financial Crime Agency New Zealand (OFCANZ), Financial Crime Group, International Services Group and Pacific Islands Chiefs of Police Secretariat. The Investigations and International Group leads the prevention, investigation, disruption and prosecution of serious and transnational crime. It also leads liaison, overseas deployment and capacity building with international policing partners. The Assistant Commissioner-Operations is responsible for Community Policing, Youth, Communications Centres, Operations Group, Prosecutions and Road Policing. The remaining three Assistant Commissioners command geographical policing areas – Upper North, Lower North and South. Each area is divided into three to five districts.

District Commanders hold the rank of superintendent, as do sworn National Managers, the road policing manager in the Waitemata District, responsible for the motorway network and traffic alcohol group, and the commandant of the Royal New Zealand Police College. Area Commanders hold the rank of inspector as do Shift Commanders based in each of the three Communications Centres. District Section Commanders are typically senior sergeants.
The New Zealand Police is a member of Interpol and has close relationships with the Australian police forces, at both the state and federal level. Several New Zealand Police representatives are posted overseas in key New Zealand diplomatic missions.

It is acknowledged, by both police and legislation, that important and valuable roles in the performance of the functions of the police are played by: public agencies or bodies (for example, local authorities and state sectors), persons who hold certain statutory offices (for example, Maori Wardens), and parts of the private sector, especially the private security industry. It is also acknowledged that it is often appropriate, or even necessary, for police to perform some of its functions by working in co-operation with citizens, or other agencies or bodies.

Districts

The New Zealand Police is organised into 12 districts: nine in the North Island and three in the South Island. Each district is subdivided into between two and four areas:

Northland – based in Whangārei; divided into two areas: Far North (Kerikeri) and Whangarei-Kaipara (Whangārei).
Waitematā – based in Henderson; divided into three areas: North (Orewa), West (Henderson), and East (Rosedale).
Auckland City – based in Auckland Central; divided into three areas: West (Avondale), Central (Auckland Central), and East (Mount Wellington).
Counties-Manukau – based in Manukau; divided into four areas: West (Ōtāhuhu), Central (Manurewa), East (Flat Bush), and South (Papakura).
Waikato – based in Hamilton; divided into three areas: Hamilton City, Waikato West (Huntly), and Waikato East (Thames).
Bay of Plenty – based in Rotorua; divided into four areas: Western Bay of Plenty (Tauranga), Eastern Bay of Plenty (Whakatāne), Rotorua, and Taupō.
Eastern – based in Hastings; divided into two areas: Hawke's Bay (Hastings) and Tairāwhiti (Gisborne).
Central – based in Palmerston North; divided into three areas: Taranaki (New Plymouth), Whanganui, and Manawatū (Palmerston North).
Wellington – based in Wellington; divided into four areas: Wellington City, Kapi-Mana (Porirua), Hutt Valley (Lower Hutt), and Wairarapa (Masterton).
Tasman – based in Nelson; divided into three areas: Nelson Bays (Nelson), Marlborough (Blenheim), and West Coast (Greymouth).
Canterbury – based in Christchurch; divided into three areas: Christchurch Metro, Canterbury Rural (Rangiora) and Aoraki (Timaru).
Southern – based in Dunedin; divided into three areas: Otago Coastal (Dunedin), Otago Lakes-Central (Queenstown), and Southland (Invercargill).

Communications centres
New Zealand Police operate three communications centres that are responsible for receiving 111 emergency calls, *555 traffic calls and general calls for service and dispatching the relevant response. The centres are:
Northern Communications Centre, based in Auckland and responsible for the northern half of the North Island, down to Hicks Bay, Desert Road south of Turangi, and Awakino
Central Communications Centre, based in Wellington and responsible for the southern half of the North Island, from Mokau, Taumarunui, the Desert Road north of Waiouru, and Te Araroa in the north
Southern Communications Centre, based in the Christchurch Central Police Station, responsible for the South Island

The Police Digital Services Centre, a new digital services and communications centre, opened in Paraparaumu in November 2018.

Ranks

A police employee becomes a constable by swearing the oath under section 22 of the New Zealand Policing Act 2008. Upon doing so the constable receives certain statutory powers and responsibilities, including the power of arrest. While constables make up the majority of the workforce, non-sworn staff and volunteers provide a wide range of support services where a constable's statutory powers are not required. Rank insignia are worn on epaulettes. Officers of inspector rank and higher are commissioned by the Governor-General, but are still promoted from the ranks of non-commissioned officers. A recently graduated constable is considered a probationary constable for up to two years, until he or she has passed 10 workplace assessment standards. The completion of the above is known as obtaining permanent appointment.
Detective ranks somewhat parallel the street ranks up to detective superintendent. Trainee detectives spend a minimum of six months as a constable on trial after completing an intensive selection and induction course. During these initial six months they are required to pass four module based exams before progression to detective constable. They are then required to continue studying with another six exam based modules as well as a number of workplace assessments. Once the detective constable has completed all of this they are then required to sit a pre-requisite exam based on all of the exam based modules they have previously sat. If they are successful in passing this they attend the Royal New Zealand Police College where they complete their training with the Detective Qualification course before receiving the final designation of detective. All of these requirements are expected to be completed within two to three years.

The rank of Senior Constable is granted to Constables after 14 years of service and the Commissioner of Police is satisfied with their conduct. Senior Constables are well regarded within the New Zealand Police for their extensive policing experience, and are often used to train and mentor other police officers.

Detective and detective constable are considered designations and not specific ranks. That is, detectives do not outrank uniformed constables. Nevertheless, a police officer with a detective designation will generally assume control of a serious crime scene rather than a uniform staff member regardless of rank.

To promote to the rank of a sergeant, constables must have at least five years of service, have a good understanding of general policing and pass the Core Policing Knowledge examination. Once completed, they are then eligible for promotion.

Insignia and uniform

New Zealand police uniforms formerly followed the British model closely but, since the 1970s, a number of changes have been implemented. These include the adoption of a medium blue shade in place of dark blue, the abolition of custodian helmets and the substitution of synthetic leather jackets for silver buttoned tunics when on ordinary duty. The normal headdress is a peaked cap with blue and white Sillitoe tartan band and silver badge. Baseball caps and Akubra wide-brimmed hats are authorised for particular duties or climatic conditions. Stab resistant and high visibility vests are normally worn on duty. The body vests are also marked with Sillitoe tartan markings.

AOS and STG members, when deployed, wear the usual charcoal-coloured clothing used by armed-response and counter-terror units around the world. In 2008, a survey found strong staff support for the re-introduction of the white custodian helmets worn until 1995, to reinforce the police's professional image.

Equipment

Communications
Police officers communicate with each other via Apple iPhones. For shorter, fast communication, front-line police officers also use radios.

In 2009 New Zealand Police began moving from using analogue two-way radios to trialling digital encrypted radios in the Wellington region. The trial was perceived as having been successful and New Zealand Police planned to roll out digital encrypted radios to all regions. However, this has not progressed as planned and only the main centres of Auckland, Wellington and Christchurch have digital encryption.

Fleet

Drones
In 2012, the police began using drones also known as unmanned aerial vehicles. By 2013, drones had been used only twice; in one case a drone was used in a criminal investigation and led to charges being laid in court. Privacy Commissioner Marie Shroff said "organisations using drones needed good privacy policies – or possibly a warrant".

Helicopters

The Air Support Unit, commonly known as Eagle, is based in Auckland at Auckland Heliport, Pikes Point, Onehunga and operates three Bell 429 GlobalRanger helicopters. In October 2017, the Eagle became a 24/7 service and in July 2019 the Bell 429 helicopters entered service to replace the AS355 Squirrels. In February 2020, an Eagle helicopter was based in Christchurch at Christchurch Airport for a five-week trial.

Maritime Units

Two maritime units are also operated – the launch Deodar III in Auckland and the launch Lady Elizabeth IV in Wellington, supported by various smaller vessels.

Road Vehicles
The Holden Commodore is the current generic road vehicle of choice for the police. In the past they have used Ford Falcons and the Nissan Maxima. The highway patrol mainly uses the Holden Commodore S variant along with the Holden VF Commodore. The police also use unmarked models of the Holden Cruze and Holden Commodore. Liveries are chequered Battenburg markings orange-blue (older models – VT, VX and VZ Commodores) or yellow-blue (newer models, Captiva, Commodore VE and VF, trucks and vans), as well as cars in standard factory colours, commonly referred to as unmarked or undercover.

Since 2008 the orange-blue livery is being phased out, and all marked patrol vehicles were expected to have the yellow-blue livery as well as LED light bars by 2014. Both Commodore sedan and wagon bodies are used – normally in V6 form. The Holden Commodore (VE, VT, VX and VZ) is currently being phased starting 2013 and slowly being replaced with Holden VF Commodores, with ZB Commodores joining the fleet in 2018. The Holden Cruze is currently only used for Youth Aid, both marked and unmarked. With Holden's announcement it would cease operations in 2021, new pursuit vehicles have been investigated. A request for proposal was issued in July 2020 and 27 different vehicle models were evaluated. In November 2020, the police announced that the Skoda Superb would supersede the Holden Commodore, with the first cars being introduced in April 2021. Dog handlers have fully enclosed utility or station wagon vehicles, which may be liveried or unmarked, with cages in the rear and remotely operated canopy doors to allow the handler to release their dog if away from the vehicle.

The police also use vans and trucks as Team Policing Units, command centres, mobile police stations and for the riot squad and armed offenders squad (AOS). The AOS also has its own vehicles, commonly Nissan X-Trail and the newly introduced Toyota Highlander (all unmarked and equipped with bullbars). It also uses the new Holden Acadia with unique markings in the upper/middle North Island.

The police use SUV-type vehicles mainly for use in rural New Zealand but can also be used in urban areas (mainly in airports). The vehicles used are the Holden Captiva, the Colorado, and its predecessor the Rodeo.

The police and Ministry of Transport (see history above) have used a wide range of different cars and motorbikes over the years.

Current police vehicles in use 

 Skoda Kodiaq 2022–Present
 Skoda Superb 2021–Present
 Holden Equinox 2020–Present
 Holden Acadia 2020–Present 
 Holden Cruze 2014–Present
 Holden Captiva 2009–Present
 Holden Colorado 2008–Present
Toyota Camry 2006–Present
Holden Commodore 1980–Present
Skoda Superb 2020-Present
Skoda Kodiaq 2020-Present

Previous police vehicles used
Humber Super Snipe 1938–1960
Vauxhall Velox 1950–1962
Ford Zephyr 1954–1967
Holden Standard/Special 1958–1968
Vauxhall Velox PB 1962–1965
Ford Falcon 1962–2000
Holden Kingswood 1968–1982
Vauxhall 3.5 Cresta 1969
Holden Belmont 1969–1987
Leyland P76 1976–1978
Ford Sierra 1984–1988
Mitsubishi V3000 1986–1989

Current police motorcycles 

BMW R1150, BMW R1200 2000–current
Yamaha MT-09 Tracer, Yamaha FJR1300AP 2021–Present 
Honda ST1300 2014–Present

Previous police motorcycles
BSA 650 Police Special 1969–1971
Triumph Trophy 650 1970s
Norton Commando 750 1970s
Various Japanese and European motorcycles including Yamaha, Suzuki, Kawasaki, BMW 1979–2000

Weapons
New Zealand Police officers carry OC spray (pepper spray), batons and tasers (stun guns). The only officers who routinely carry firearms are members of the Diplomatic Protection Squad, and those with dog and airport units. All officers are trained to use Glock 17 pistols and Bushmaster XM15 M4A3 Patrolman AR-15 type, military style semi-automatic rifles and wear a holster attachment in case they do need a pistol. Since 2012, frontline vehicles have had a locked box in the passenger foot-well containing two loaded and holstered Glock 17s and, in the rear of the vehicle, a locked case with two Bushmaster rifles and ballistic vests. Officers must tell their supervisor or communications staff if they are accessing a firearm from their vehicle. The vehicles are fitted with alarms in case windows are broken. Each officer carries vehicle keys and safe keys.

The Police Association claims the carrying of handguns is inevitable. In January 2013, a Waikato officer was attacked by at least five men after he deployed his OC spray and Taser. His radio was taken from him and his pistol was 'misplaced' during the attack. The Police Association's request for routine carrying of firearms for all officers after this incident was dismissed by the Police Commissioner. The current firearm training and issuing policy has been criticised. Not all police officers receive regular firearm training and not all vehicles contain a firearm. In October 2015, unarmed officers at a routine police checkpoint at Te Atatū South who pursued a vehicle that sped off from the checkpoint were shot at from the offender's vehicle. In December 2015, the Police Association referred to the incident while requesting that all frontline officers receive firearm training and that their vehicles contain a secured firearm. This was rejected.

In July 2015, the Police Commissioner announced that Tasers would be routinely carried by police officers. Tasers were first trialled in 2006 and in 2010 were rolled out throughout New Zealand with all frontline vehicles containing an X26 or X2 Taser in a locked box. In 2012, figures showed that a 'disproportionate number of people' targeted by police Tasers were mental health patients.

Police officers receive regular Police Integrated Tactical Training (PITT) with different levels of training, depending upon an officer's role and responsibilities. In 2017, a training model was introduced, and the number of officers trained as so-called 'Level 1 responders' increased to 79%. Level 1 includes training with pistols, rifles, tasers, defensive tactics, handcuffs, OC spray and batons. In 2019, Level 1 responder live-fire training and simunitions training increased by 50%. Police annually release a report of their use of force including OC spray, Tasers and firearms.

Since 2019, all officers wear a Body Armour System (BAS). This is a stab-resistant vest with equipment pouches that can be fitted with ballistic hard armour plates. The BAS replaced the stab resistant body armour (SRBA) introduced in 2006 and the ballistic Hard Armour Plate (HAP) which could be worn over the SRBA.

Notable incidents
 

On 8 October 1941, four police officers were killed by South Island farmer Stanley Graham, 40, who fired at them as they attempted to seize arms from his West Coast home at Kowhitirangi. After widespread searches, two policemen and a local civilian saw Graham carrying his rifle and ammunition belts on 20 October. He was shot by Constable James D'Arcy Quirke with a .303 rifle, from a distance of 25 meters, while crawling through a patch of scrub. He died early the next morning in Westland Hospital, Hokitika.

The police investigation into the murders of Harvey and Jeanette Crewe in 1970 was a turning point in the public's perception of the police. A royal commission subsequently found that the police had planted evidence and framed Arthur Allan Thomas for the murder. Writer Keith Hunter believes this introduced "a cynicism (in attitudes towards the police) that infects us today."

During the 1981 Springbok tour, the police formed three riot squads known as Red Squad, Blue Squad and White Squad to control anti-apartheid protesters who laid siege to rugby union fields where the touring team was playing. Police were described as being heavy-handed with their batons as they tried to 'subdue' protesters opposed to the Springbok tour. The tour had a significant effect on public perceptions of the police who since this time "have never been viewed with the same general benign approval".

In July 1985, the New Zealand Police arrested two French Action Service operatives after the Rainbow Warrior was bombed and sunk in Auckland harbour. The rapid arrest was attributed to the high level of public support for the investigation.

In October 2007 at least 17 people were arrested in a series of raids under the Suppression of Terrorism Act and the Arms Act 1983. The raids targeted a range of political activists allegedly involved in illegal firearms activity. The case dragged on for nearly four years and cost taxpayers millions of dollars. Much of the surveillance evidence was found to have been gained illegally and charges against all but four defendants were dropped. The remaining four were charged with firearms offences, found guilty and sentenced to terms of imprisonment and home detention.

On 20 January 2012, the police flew in by helicopter and arrested Kim Dotcom and three others in Coatesville, Auckland, in an armed raid on Dotcom's house following United States cybercrime indictments against him for on-line piracy via his internet file sharing company, Megaupload. Assets worth $17 million were seized including eighteen luxury cars, giant screen TVs and works of art. According to Dotcom, about 80 police officers were involved in the operation; the New Zealand police claimed it was between 20 and 30. The incident became controversial when a district court judge ruled that the warrants issued for the property seizures were invalid and it turned out the Government Communications Security Bureau (GCSB) had broken the law when asked by police to spy on Dotcom.

Police and civilian deaths

Police killed on duty

Since 1 September 1886, 33 police officers have been killed by criminals.

A member of the New Zealand Police, Sergeant Stewart Graeme Guthrie, was the last New Zealand civilian recipient of the George Cross, which is awarded for conspicuous gallantry. He fired a warning shot near a gunman at Aramoana on 13 November 1990, but was killed by a return shot from the gunman, who also killed twelve others. , 29 police officers have been killed by criminal acts, and about 17 by accident, while in the performance of their official duties. The most recent policeman to die was Constable Matthew Dennis Hunt, who was shot and killed during a routine traffic stop.

Civilian deaths involving police
In June 2012 the Independent Police Conduct Authority (IPCA) released a comprehensive report on deaths in police custody. There were 27 deaths in the last ten years – ten of which were suicides. Seven deaths occurred when police were overly vigorous in the use of restraint. Another seven were "caused by the detainee's medical condition" which got dramatically worse in police custody, and three deaths were drug related when police failed to ascertain the detainees were on drugs. Of the 27 deaths, the IPCA said only four "involved serious neglect of duty or breaches of policy by police". On top of deaths in custody, police have shot and killed seven people in the last ten years. One was an innocent bystander, and another two were not carrying firearms but were carrying other weapons. The police were exonerated in all seven cases.

Numerous people have also died in collisions during or shortly after police car chases. In the five years after December 2003, 24 people died and 91 received serious injuries in police pursuits. Over this period, the IPCA made numerous recommendations to change police protocols, but the death rate continued to climb. In 2010, 18 drivers fleeing police were killed. Fourteen of the deaths were triggered by pursuits over minor offences rather than serious crimes. That year police conducted the fourth review of pursuit policy in six years and ignored key recommendations of the Independent Police Conduct Authority making only minor changes to the policy. Over the next 12 months, 15 drivers died in the course of police pursuits. 14% of pursuits result in a crash either by the police or the offender but police guidelines do not provide a predetermined speed at which officers should pull out of a pursuit. The IPCA has now recommended that pursuit policy would should require officers to "state a reason for beginning a pursuit," and recommended compulsory alcohol and drug testing of police officers involved in fatal incidents.

Counter-terrorism and military assistance

Since 2005 the NZ Police's main counterterrorism and threat assessment group is the National Security Investigations Team, previously known as the Special Investigation Group. The NSIT is composed of four teams in regional centres, with a remit that covers early intervention in cases of extremism, soliciting informants, and building relationships with communities. Public information on the NSIT was released in relation to criticism of its handling of right wing terrorism in the lead up to the Christchurch terror attack.

The NZ Police are accountable for the operational response to threats to national security, including terrorism. If an incident escalates to a level where their internal resources are unable to adequately deal with the issue (for example, a major arms encounter or a significant terrorist threat), the Police Incident Controller may call on extra assistance from the New Zealand Defence Force and in particular NZ's Special Forces, the military focused New Zealand Special Air Service and terrorism focused Commando Squadron (D Squadron). Control of the incident remains with police throughout. As of 2009, the two military counter terrorist units have never been deployed in a domestic law-enforcement operation. Military resources such as Light Armoured Vehicles have been used and requested before, such as during the Napier shootings, and Royal New Zealand Air Force helicopters from No. 3 Squadron are often used to assist in search and rescue and cannabis eradication operations.

In 1964, the Armed Offenders Squad (AOS) was created to provide a specialist armed response unit, similar to the Metropolitan Police Service's SC&O19 in the United Kingdom. In addition to the AOS, the New Zealand Police maintain a full-time counter-terrorist unit, the Special Tactics Group (STG). Similar to the FBI's Hostage Rescue Team, the STG train in dynamic entry and other tactics vital in high-risk situations. The STG train with the SAS and are the last line of law enforcement response available before a police Incident Controller calls in support from the Defence Force.

Crime statistics

Crime statistics are documented in the police annual report. The police also publish bi-yearly statistical summaries of crime for both New Zealand as a whole and each police district. In early 2005, crime statistics for both recorded crime and recorded apprehensions for the last 10 years were published by Statistics New Zealand. These statistics provide offence statistics related to individual sections of legislation and appear to be the most detailed national crime statistics available today.

Controversies
During the early years of the present century several controversies put the Police under close scrutiny. Some have been investigated by the Independent Police Conduct Authority; others have received significant publicity.

INCIS

The Integrated National Crime Information System (INCIS) was a computer software package developed by IBM in the early 1990s to provide improved information, investigation and analysis capabilities to the police. Deputy Police Commissioner, Barry Matthews, was responsible for its implementation and acknowledged that police requested 'hundreds and hundreds of changes' to the system as the programme was being developed. It never worked as required and ended up costing $130 million before it was finally abandoned in 2000.

The wasted resources and on-going problems surrounding the failure of the project were a huge distraction for the police. When it was about to be scrapped, Police Association president Greg O'Connor said "The reality of it is that the sooner ... the huge distraction that is Incis is gone, the better." Funding wasted on INCIS subsequently led to budget cuts in other areas so that infrastructure such as cars and communications centres were poorly resourced.

Photographing young Maori (Rangatahi)
In 2021, police were accused of racially profiling Māori and young people by taking photos of any youth apprehended during the course of patrols or considered "suspicious" on a mobile app called "OnDuty" connected to the National Intelligence Application (NIA) system. Police claim the photos were a necessary part of combatting crime through more effective intelligence sharing.

Communications centres
In 2004 and 2005, the police were criticised over several incidents in which callers to the Police Communications Centres, particularly those using the 111 emergency telephone number, received inadequate responses. In October 2004, the Commissioner of Police ordered an Independent Review into the Communications Centres under sustained political scrutiny after the Iraena Asher incident received a lot of publicity and a whistle-blowing employee resigned. On 11 May 2005, the Review Panel released its report which criticised the service for systemic failures and inadequate management. The report expressed ongoing concerns for public safety.

Police acted on the recommendations of the review with a number of initiatives, including increasing communications centre staff numbers and then initiating a demonstration project for a single non-emergency number centre, to reduce the load on the 111 service. The single non-emergency number 105 was launched on 10 May 2019.

Historical sexual misconduct by police
In 2004, a number of historical sexual misconduct allegations dating from the 1980s were made against both serving and former police officers. In March 2006 assistant police commissioner Clinton Rickards and former police officers Brad Shipton and Bob Schollum were charged with raping and sexually abusing Louise Nicholas in Rotorua during the 1980s. The defendants claimed all sex was consensual and were found not guilty on 31 March 2006. In February 2007 the same three men faced historical charges of kidnapping and indecent assault for the pack rape of a 16-year-old girl with a whisky bottle that took place in the early 1980s, and again they were acquitted. Throughout both trials, the jury were unaware that Brad Shipton and Bob Schollum had been convicted of a previous pack rape in 2005 and were already serving prison sentences for this crime.

Rickards was forced to resign from the police but was paid $300,000 as part of his termination package. Complaints about inappropriate sexual behaviour by police officers led to a three-year inquiry conducted by Dame Margaret Bazley. Her highly critical report was released in 2007.

Poor prosecution of sexual abuse cases
In 2008 there was a public scandal regarding the failure of police to investigate a backlog of sexual abuse cases in the Wairarapa. The then head of the Masterton Criminal Investigation Bureau, Detective Senior Sergeant Mark McHattie, received an unspecified disciplinary "outcome" and has since been promoted to head of the Auckland CIB's serious crime unit.

Spying on community, union and activist groups

In 2008, the police's Special Investigation Group came under considerable media scrutiny after it was revealed Chrischurch man Rob Gilchrist had been hired by officers to spy on individuals and organisations including Greenpeace, Iraq war protestors, student associations, unions, animal rights and climate change campaigners.

Detention of youth in police cells
The Independent Police Conduct Authority launched a wider investigation into the treatment of young people in police cells and in October 2012 issued a report which found that the number of young people being held has more than doubled since 2009. It said that "youths in crisis are being locked up in police cells and denied their human rights." Practices that "are, or risk being, inconsistent with accepted human rights" include: being held in solitary confinement; having cell lights on 24 hours a day; family members being prevented access; and not being allowed to see the doctor when they have medical or mental health problems. The IPCA made 24 recommendations into how police can improve the detention and treatment of young people in custody.

Bullying
In 2019, it was reported that there had been claims of bullying within New Zealand Police.

Taranaki death in custody, June 2020
On 3 June 2020, three police officers in the town Hāwera in the Taranaki region were charged with manslaughter in relation to the death of a 55-year-old man who died in police custody in early June 2019. The man's death had been investigated by the Independent Police Conduct Authority.

Armed response teams
On 9 June 2020, Police Commissioner Andrew Coster announced that the police would be scrapping their armed response teams after public feedback and consultation with the Māori and Pasifika communities. Public discussion around the armed response teams was influenced by concerns about police-community relations in light of the murder of George Floyd, which sparked protests around the world including New Zealand.

Alo Ngata's death
On 27 August 2020, the Independent Police Conduct Authority criticised the Police's handling of the detention of Alo Ngata, who died in police custody in July 2018 after he had been incorrectly fitted with a spit hood. Ngata had been arrested for assaulting an elderly pensioner named Mike Reilly in Auckland's Freemans Bay and had violently resisted arrest. While the IPCA considered the Police's use of force to be reasonable, they found that the police had failed to assess his well-being while in custody. Both Ngata and Reilly's family have asked the police to release footage from the Police helicopter showing Ngata assaulting Reilly.

See also

Armed Offenders Squad
Cook Islands Police Service
Corruption in New Zealand
Crime in New Zealand
Crimes Act 1961
Diplomatic Protection Service
Gangs in New Zealand
Independent Police Conduct Authority
Institute of Environmental Science and Research – provider of forensic services to NZ police
New Zealand Police Negotiation Team
Organised Crime Agency
Royal New Zealand Police College
Special Tactics Group

Notes

References

External links

New Zealand Police Association

   
Police
1842 establishments in New Zealand